Hu Zhaoheng (1915–1999) original name Li Xin, was a People's Republic of China politician. He was born in Xingyang, Henan (at the time Xingyang County). He participated in the December 9th Movement of 1935 and later the 120th Division, 358th Brigade of the Eighth Route Army. During the Chinese Civil War, he was active in Northeast China and Inner Mongolia. He was mayor of Tianjin and a delegate to the 3rd National People's Congress. He also worked at the Ministry of Health of the People's Republic of China as a vice-minister.

References

1915 births
1999 deaths
People's Republic of China politicians from Henan
Chinese Communist Party politicians from Henan
Delegates to the 3rd National People's Congress
Government ministers of the People's Republic of China
Mayors of Tianjin